Steve Holland (January 8, 1925May 10, 1997) was an American actor and male paperback, magazine, and fashion model.

Career
Before his acting credits, Holland was the model for Fawcett Comics' fictitious B-Western cowboy Bob Colt, that ran for ten issues in the early 1950s,

Holland played Flash Gordon in the 1954 television series of the same name. The television show ran 39 episodes. He had a cameo appearance in the 1953 movie, The Court-Martial of Billy Mitchell.

His best-known model role was for artist James Bama's illustrations of the character Doc Savage used on the covers of the paperback reprints of the 1960s. Bama called him "the world's greatest male model." His facial features were also used in the 1970s reprint of the original pulp Avenger novels. Holland was also the model for Mack Bolan of The Executioner novels.

References

External links

Flash Gordon Episode Guide
Holland as Doc Savage 
Steve Holland – The World’s Greatest Male Model

1925 births
1997 deaths
American male models
Place of birth missing